Aleksei Aleksandrovich Solovyov (born 15 March 1996) is a Russian football player. He plays for FC Spartak Kostroma.

Club career
He made his debut in the Russian Professional Football League for FC Zenit Penza on 10 April 2016 in a game against FC Chertanovo Moscow.

He made his Russian Football National League debut for FC Armavir on 17 July 2018 in a game against FC SKA-Khabarovsk.

References

External links
 

1996 births
Footballers from Moscow
Living people
Russian footballers
Association football defenders
Association football midfielders
FC Armavir players
FC Lokomotiv Moscow players
FC Fakel Voronezh players
FC SKA Rostov-on-Don players
FC Urozhay Krasnodar players
FC Metallurg Lipetsk players
FC Spartak Kostroma players
Russian First League players
Russian Second League players